Men's 400m races for athletes with cerebral palsy at the 2004 Summer Paralympics were held in the Athens Olympic Stadium. Events were held in three disability classes.

T36

The T36 event consisted of 2 heats and a final. It was won by Artem Arefyev, representing .

1st Round

Heat 1
23 Sept. 2004, 17:50

Heat 2
23 Sept. 2004, 17:57

Final Round
24 Sept. 2004, 17:55

T37

The T37 event consisted of a single race. It was won by Oleksandr Driha, representing .

Final Round
25 Sept. 2004, 20:15

T38

The T38 event consisted of 2 heats and a final. It was won by Tim Sullivan, representing .

1st Round

Heat 1
26 Sept. 2004, 18:45

Heat 2
26 Sept. 2004, 18:52

Final Round
27 Sept. 2004, 17:40

References

M